The 2016 Asian Men's Volleyball Cup, so-called 2016 AVC Cup for Men was the fifth edition of the Asian Men's Volleyball Cup, a biennial international volleyball tournament organised by the Asian Volleyball Confederation (AVC) with Thailand Volleyball Association (TVA). The tournament was held at Nakhon Pathom Gymansium, Nakhon Pathom, Thailand from 22 to 28 September 2016.

Pools composition
Teams were seeded in the first two positions of each pool following the Serpentine system according to their final standing of the 2015 Asian Championship. AVC reserved the right to seed the hosts as head of Pool A regardless of the final standing of the 2015 Asian Championship. All teams not seeded were drawn. Final standing of the 2015 Asian Championship are shown in brackets except Hosts who ranked 8th.

*  replaced Qatar, who withdrew from the tournament.

Squads

Venue
 Nakhon Pathom Gymnasium, Nakhon Pathom, Thailand

Pool standing procedure
 Number of matches won
 Match points
 Sets ratio
 Points ratio
 Result of the last match between the tied teams

Match won 3–0 or 3–1: 3 match points for the winner, 0 match points for the loser
Match won 3–2: 2 match points for the winner, 1 match point for the loser

Preliminary round
All times are Indochina Time (UTC+07:00).

Pool A

|}

|}

Pool B

|}

|}

Final round
All times are Indochina Time (UTC+07:00).

Quarterfinals

|}

5th–8th semifinals

|}

Semifinals

|}

7th place match

|}

5th place match

|}

3rd place match

|}

Final

|}

Final standing

Awards

Most Valuable Player
 Alireza Behboudi
Best Setter
 Shohei Yamaguchi
Best Outside Spikers
 Liu Libin
 Rahman Davoudi

Best Middle Blockers
 Miao Ruantong
 Masoud Gholami
Best Opposite Spiker
 Jiang Chuan
Best Libero
 Tung Li-yi

References

External links
Official website
Squads

2016
AVC Cup
Asian Men's Cup,2016
AVC Cup
September 2016 sports events in Asia